Leonid Todorovski (born November 5, 1998) is a Macedonian professional basketball center who currently plays for KK Rabotnički of the Macedonian First League.

References

External links
 aba-liga.com
 fiba.com 
 eurobasket.com

1998 births
Living people
Macedonian men's basketball players
Centers (basketball)
KK MZT Skopje players